The Paradise Tour was the second concert tour by American singer, Lana Del Rey, in support of her third extended play, Paradise. The tour kicked off on April 3, 2013 at Galaxie Mega Hall in Amnéville, France and visited many major European countries during the spring and summer in 2013. The tour concluded on October 18, 2014 at the Hollywood Forever Cemetery in Los Angeles. Overall, the tour lasted over eighteen months from April 2013 to October 2014 and visited four continents.

Background
On November 12, 2012, Del Rey released her third extended play, Paradise worldwide. The extended play was released as a stand-alone EP, but was also re-released with her second studio album, Born to Die, which was named Born to Die: The Paradise Edition. The EP debuted at number 10 on the United States Billboard 200 with a first week sales of 67,000 copies and also charted fairly in other European countries. The album also gained positive reviews from many critics including the Rolling Stone calling the EP "conceptually sharp" and the Los Angeles Times stating that the album is "strong". Dates for a tour in support of the EP were announced on October 31, 2012 beginning with an extensive European leg of shows, and tickets became available on November 5, 2012. Gradually, Del Rey began to add more dates including festival and headlining shows in many European countries such as Germany, Sweden, and Norway. During 2013, Del Rey announced dates for United States, Turkey, Brazil, Chile, and Argentina. Most of the European shows from April to May 2013 were supported by Kassidy, a Scottish band fronted by Del Rey's then boyfriend, Barrie-James O'Neill.

The tour was later extended into 2014, during the 2014 shows Del Rey performed songs from Ultraviolence. During February and March 2014, a leg of North American shows were announced surrounding Del Rey's appearances at the Coachella Valley Music and Arts Festival. Throughout the following months, more dates were announced including European and American festival shows, and headlining shows in Mexico. The entire tour concluded with two one-off shows at the Hollywood Forever Cemetery in Los Angeles during October 2014.

Set list
This set list is representative of the show on May 3, 2013, in Turin, Italy. It does not represent all dates throughout the tour.

"Cola"	
"Body Electric"
"Blue Jeans"
"Born to Die"
"Carmen"
"Million Dollar Man"
"Blue Velvet"
"American"
"Without You"
"Knockin' on Heaven's Door" (Bob Dylan cover)
"Young and Beautiful"
"Ride"	
"Summertime Sadness"
"Burning Desire"
"Video Games"
"National Anthem"

Shows

Cancelled shows

Notes

Box office score data

References

2013 concert tours
2014 concert tours
Lana Del Rey concert tours
Concert tours of Europe
Concert tours of Asia
Concert tours of North America
Concert tours of South America
Concert tours of France
Concert tours of Denmark
Concert tours of Germany
Concert tours of Sweden
Concert tours of Norway
Concert tours of Austria
Concert tours of Switzerland
Concert tours of Italy
Concert tours of Spain
Concert tours of the United Kingdom
Concert tours of Ireland
Concert tours of the Netherlands
Concert tours of Belgium
Concert tours of Finland
Concert tours of Russia
Concert tours of the United States
Concert tours of Mexico
Concert tours of Canada